Alaena bjornstadi is a species of butterfly in the family Lycaenidae. It is found in Tanzania. Its habitat consists of rocky grassland.

Adults are on wing from mid-February to mid-March.

References

Butterflies described in 1993
Alaena
Endemic fauna of Tanzania
Butterflies of Africa